The China Railways TH10 class steam locomotive was a class of 4-6-0 passenger steam locomotives operated by the China Railway. Originally amongst the first locomotives ordered by the South Manchuria Railway (Mantetsu), they were later operated by the privately owned Jichang Jidun Railway and its successor, the Manchukuo National Railway, which designated them Tehoni class. The "Teho" name came from the American naming system for steam locomotives, under which locomotives with 4-6-0 wheel arrangement were called "Ten-Wheeler".

These locomotives should not be confused with the Mantetsu Tehoni class engines, which were reclassified Tehoi class in 1938.

History
After rebuilding its lines to standard gauge in 1906, Mantetsu needed new locomotives, and placed several orders with American builders. One of these orders was placed with ALCO for four 4-4-0 (Amei class) and two 4-6-0 passenger locomotives. These were initially numbered 100 and 101, and with the introduction of Mantetsu's 1907 classification system, they were designated class F and renumbered 600 and 601. These four locomotives were originally built for an American customer but delivered to Manchuria instead; according to Mantetsu records, the original customer was the Boston & Maine Railroad, but according to ALCO records, they were - like the Amei class 4-4-0s - originally built for the Chicago Southern Railway (later part of the Milwaukee Road. After brief use on the main line, they were used for mixed trains and goods trains on the Anfeng Line between Fengtian and Andong.

Mantetsu found it inconvenient to operate a class of only two locomotives, so in 1918 they were both transferred to the Jichang Railway, which in 1931 merged with the Jidun Railway to form the Jichang Jidun Railway, where they were numbered 200 and 201. In 1933, the Manchukuo National Railway was created through the nationalisation and merger of several privately owned railways, including the Jichang-Jidun Railway, and these locomotives passed on to the Manchukuo National, which classified them Tehoni (テホニ) class, numbered 5621 and 5622, becoming Tehoni 501 and 502 in 1938.

Postwar
Both were taken over by the Republic of China Railway after the end of the Pacific War. Following the establishment of the People's Republic and the current China Railway, they were designated class ㄊㄏ十 (TH10) in 1951, becoming class TH10 (written in Pinyin instead of Zhuyin) in 1959.

References

4-6-0 locomotives
ALCO locomotives
Railway locomotives introduced in 1906
Steam locomotives of China
Standard gauge locomotives of China
Rolling stock of Manchukuo
Passenger locomotives